The Greek mythology character Circe has appeared many times in the 20th and 21st century popular culture, either under her own name or as a sorceress with similar powers under others. Post-Classical amplifications and reinterpretations of that story and others involving her are dealt with in the main article. The instances mentioned here are more recent allusions and adaptations.

Literature
James Joyce's 1922 novel Ulysses includes a chapter based on Homer's Circe episode (see Ulysses (novel)#Episode 15, Circe) in which a brothel owner named Bella Cohen is loosely based on the classical Circe.
In John Myers Myers's 1949 novel Silverlock, Circe turns the main character into a pig due to his proclivity for food and fornication.
Although Julio Cortázar titled one of his short stories "Circe" (1951), its main theme is about perverse sexual gratification in a repressed Catholic environment. Delia Mañara is notorious in her quarter of Buenos Aires for the mysterious deaths of two of her fiancés. She lives in a twilight world and gains most satisfaction through the exercise of power over others. It emerges that she killed the two men by poisoning them with the sweets she makes; when this fails with her third fiancé, he is freed from her fatal attraction by the knowledge. In 1964 it was made into a film in Argentina with Graciela Borges as Delia.
In 1992 novel The Brothers K by David James Duncan, Everett has an extended sexual encounter with a woman named Circe. At one point she shows him a mirror and he sees himself as a pig in his reflection.
Circe appears in Dan Simmons' 2005 science-fiction novel Olympos, whose plot draws upon The Odyssey.
In Rick Riordan's 2006 novel The Sea of Monsters Circe runs an island health spa and turns Percy Jackson into a guinea pig (she says that they are "much more convenient" than real pigs), and his friend Annabeth Chase uses magical multivitamins to restore Percy to his true form. It is revealed she turned Blackbeard and some of his crew into guinea pigs, and once they turn back they wreck the place. Circe also appears in subsequent novels in the series.
Madeline Miller's 2018 novel Circe follows the character through her life, focusing on Circe's own interpretation of events. The novel focuses on her life as an outcast god, her journey to understanding mortals, and ultimately Circe coming to terms with herself.

Comics 
In the DC Universe, Circe is a constant and deadly foe of Wonder Woman and is in league with the witchcraft goddess Hecate.
In the Marvel Universe, the immortal Eternal superheroine Sersi, created by Jack Kirby, is based on Circe, transforming Odysseus's men into pigs not out of malice, but because they were misbehaving at one of her parties.
In the 1963 Carl Barks comic Oddball Odyssey, Magica de Spell impersonates a modern-day descendant of Circe and lures Scrooge McDuck to a Mediterranean island to bid on "ancient treasure" (actually worthless imitations). Her initial plan fails, but she then discovers a sealed-up cave that turns out to be where the real Circe once lived. Finding Circe's magic wand, Magica proceeds to turn Scrooge, Donald Duck and his young nephews into animals, referencing Circe's abilities in the original Odyssey. Only the eventual destruction of the wand prevents Magica's triumph. However, in some later Carl Barks stories Magica is still using formulas she says she found in Circe's cave.

Film and television
 Circe was portrayed as the beautiful seductress by Silvana Mangano in the 1954 movie Ulysses, keeping Kirk Douglas as her willful prisoner. Mangano also plays a double role in the film as Ulysses' faithful wife Penelope.
In the 1968 European television miniseries The Odyssey, Circe is portrayed by French actress Juliette Mayniel.
In the 1983 film Hercules, Circe is played by Mirella D'Angelo and appears first as an old woman. Transformed by drinking the hero's blood, she helps him when he is attacked by the robots that stand in for monsters in this 'updated' version, but for selfish reasons of her own.
Circe is portrayed as a more flippant and seductive character by Bernadette Peters in the 1997 American television miniseries The Odyssey.
Circe appeared disguised as "Mrs. Cissy Hawk" ("hawk" being the English version of "Circe") in the episode "The Remarkable Mrs. Hawk" on the show Thriller, hosted by Boris Karloff. The episode was based on the short story "Mrs. Hawk" by Margaret St. Clair, originally published in the July 1950 issue of Weird Tales.
Circe appears in the sixth and 12th episodes of first series of 2013 drama series Atlantis, portrayed by Lucy Cohu.
Circe appeared in the cartoon Ulysses 31 where she attempted to build a tower that would house all the knowledge of the universe, thus making her more powerful than the gods.
Circe is depicted in one episode of Hercules: The Animated Series (voiced by Idina Menzel) as a beautiful voluptuous young woman with long black hair, wearing a red mermaid style chiton dress and holding a dragon-headed magic staff in her hand, searching for "one good man" and picks Hercules' best friend Icarus. When she tires of his foolish behavior, she turns him into a platypus, later, Hercules into a lemur and then Prince Adonis into a peacock.
 In an episode of the Disney cartoon series DuckTales, titled "Home, Sweet Homer", Circe (voiced by Tress MacNeille) appears as an anthropomorphic pig with a pet black cat. She attempts to send Homer forward in time, but her cat interrupts the spell, and instead Scrooge McDuck, Huey, Dewey and Louie are brought back in time to ancient Greece. She eventually succeeds in turning Queen Ariel, Homer, and Scrooge into pigs, but is later foiled when Huey shatters her medallion; this not only reverses all the spells she has cast—causing everyone she has transformed to revert to their normal selves—but she herself is turned into an ordinary (i.e., non-anthropomorphic) pig.
In the animated show Generator Rex, Circe is a minor supporting character, who is the romantic interest and girlfriend of the titular character, Rex Salazar. Like her lover, she is one of the few E.V.O.s who appear fully human and has full control over her strong sound/vocal-related abilities. The show ended before she and Rex's romantic relationship could be explored any further. 
In The Simpsons,  in 14 episode of 13 season ("Tales from the Public Domain"), Circe (Lindsey Naegle) appears in the first story, "D'oh, Brother Where Art Thou?".
In the book and television series Game of Thrones, major character Cersei Lannister draws name and traits from Circe.
In part 3 of Chilling Adventures of Sabrina, Pagan witch Circe has the ability to change a person into “any creature she’s ever seen.” She transforms friends of Harvey Kinkle into pigs (then back again). She also turns a solid stone Roz and Dorcas back to life.
In 2021, Marvel Studios Eternals introduces an eternal named Sersi who is based on the Marvel Comics character who in turn is based on the goddess Cerci.

Video games 
Circe is one of the summonable Servants that appears in the mobile game Fate/Grand Order, appearing under the Caster class. She can be summoned after the release of the Salem story chapter.
Circe appears in the mission 'Old Friends' of the campaign in the 2002 Ensemble Studios game Age of Mythology as an enemy waylaying Odysseus and his allies in her trademark human-to-animal fashion.
Circe is briefly mentioned in the MMORPG Pirate101 as the Immortal that cursed the sirens Agalope, Calypso and Parthenope  with their "irresistible" voices, which lured in Eagle captains to crash their ships into the island of Anthemusa.
Circe is a playable character in the MOBA game Heroes of Newerth.

References

Classical mythology in popular culture
Greek and Roman deities in fiction
Circe